The Crow Hollow Site is located in Haney, Wisconsin, USA.

Description
The site is a rare Middle Archaic campsite along the Kickapoo River, occupied as early as 5,000 years ago, where archaeologists have found points, scrapers, grindstones and refuse and storage pits. It was added to the State and the National Register of Historic Places in 2002.

References

Archaeological sites on the National Register of Historic Places in Wisconsin
National Register of Historic Places in Crawford County, Wisconsin
Protected areas of Crawford County, Wisconsin